Sky News Australia is an Australian news channel owned by News Corp Australia. Originally launched on 19 February 1996, it broadcasts rolling news coverage throughout the day, while its prime time lineup is dedicated to opinion-based programs featuring a line-up of conservative commentators.  

Sky News Australia is distributed on pay television in Australia and New Zealand, while a free-to-air version of the service, Sky News Regional (which features programming from Sky News Australia and Fox Sports News) is distributed on digital terrestrial television by Southern Cross Austereo and selected WIN Television stations. The channel also operates two spin-off services, Sky News Weather Channel, and public affairs service Sky News Extra (formerly A-PAC).

The channel was originally a joint venture between British broadcaster BSkyB (thus making it a spin-off of the Sky News channel in the United Kingdom), Seven Media Group, and Nine Entertainment Co., as Australian News Channel Pty Ltd. The company was acquired by News Corp Australia in 2016; with the subsequent sale of Murdoch's remaining shares in Sky UK to Comcast, Sky News Australia no longer has any direct ties to its UK counterpart. 

Especially since the acquisition of the channel by News Corp Australia, Sky News Australia has faced scrutiny from the press over its increased focus on opinion programming. Comparisons were drawn to Rupert Murdoch's American news channel Fox News, and there have been accusations that the channel's opinion programming has promoted misinformation and conspiracy theories, and provided a platform for far-right figures.

History

Sky News Channel's parent company, Australian News Channel (ANC), was owned equally by British Sky Broadcasting (now Sky Limited; which is now a division of Comcast), Seven Media Group and Nine Entertainment Co., each with a 33% stake in the company from its founding until December 2016, when it was acquired by News Corp Australia.

In 2004, Sky News began broadcasting Sky News Active, its on-demand interactive TV news service. In 2008, Sky News launched the Sky News Business Channel, and on 20 January 2009, Sky News launched Australian Public Affairs Channel (A-PAC). It began widescreen broadcasting on 17 May 2009. Sky News Australia began broadcasting in high definition on 1 December 2015. A fourth spin-off channel, Sky News Election Channel, was launched on 1 May 2016. 

In 2013, Sky News Australia was granted 20 million in funding from its parent company to be used over three years. 

In mid-2019, the channel began expanding its digital operations. This included a content partnership with YouTube, Microsoft News, Facebook and Taboola. That led to new, opinion-focused videos being uploaded more frequently and across News Corp platforms, after having previously not uploaded any videos from February 2017 to April 2019.
In February 2018, Sky News Australia launched a digital-first brand and content platform called 2600. The online political newsletter is sent out daily with breaking news from Canberra.

In November 2018, Sky News terminated the contract of former Liberal Party MP and late-night presenter Ross Cameron for using racist language to describe Chinese people.

Programming 

Sky News programming consists of a mix of live news bulletins, live broadcasts from events (such as Parliament Question Time and selected press conferences), original commentary panel programs and simulcasts of international sister station Sky News UK. Sky News has broadcast every sitting of Question Time from the House of Representatives since its launch in 1996.

Sky News Australia increased its primetime programming offerings, particularly its political-themed shows, significantly in 2013, when it made more obvious its right-leaning ideology, ahead of the 2013 federal election, cancelling almost entirely the slot's rolling news block News Night. It would then regain most of its runtime in 2014. Sky News Australia rebranded itself on 19 January 2015 as "Sky News Live", dropping the "Sky News National" branding.

On weekdays, throughout most of the day, rolling news coverage is presented from one of Sky News Australia's studios. From 5 pm (AEST/AEDT), commentary programs begin, and continue through primetime until 11 pm AEST/AEDT. Most of these programs are presented by conservative commentators discussing the news of the day, often with a panel of other commentators, and feature a news update at the beginning of the program (and sometimes further updates during the program). Rolling news continues from 11 pm AEST/AEDT before coverage switches to an overnight simulcast of Sky News UK at 1 am AEST/AEDT.

In 2007, Sky News aired local breakaway programming for New Zealand viewers in primetime, filmed at Prime NZ's Auckland studios. One of these programs, Prime News – First at 5:30, was also simulcast to Australian viewers. The debut of Sky News NZ Evening News was watched by just 1,500 viewers and panned by critics. As of 2015, no local New Zealand programs are produced or broadcast following the loss of a production contract with Prime NZ. However the channel debuted New Zealand Agenda on 16 June 2018, hosted by New Zealand bureau chief James O'Doherty from Wellington, New Zealand, focusing on NZ politics.

Current programs 
Daytime
 First Edition with Peter Stefanovic (Monday-Friday)
 Weekend Edition (Saturday-Sunday)
 Sky News Breakfast with Jaynie Seal and Samatha Chiari (Only on Sky News Regional & Sky News Weather) (Monday-Friday)
 AM Agenda with Laura Jayes (Monday-Friday)
 Outsiders with Rowan Dean, Rita Panahi, and James Morrow (Sundays)
 Business Weekend with Ross Greenwood (Sundays)
 NewsDay with Tom Connell and Ashleigh Gillon (Monday-Friday)
 Weekend Live (Saturday-Sunday)
 Afternoon Agenda with Kieran Gilbert (Monday-Friday)
 Business Now with Ross Greenwood (Monday-Friday)
 The Kenny Report with Chris Kenny (Monday-Friday)

Nighttime
 Credlin with Peta Credlin (Monday-Friday)
 The Bolt Report with Andrew Bolt (Monday-Thursday)
 Bernardi with Cory Bernardi (Fridays)
 Erin with Erin Molan (Sundays)
 Paul Murray Live with Paul Murray (Sunday-Thursday)
 The Media Show with Jack Houghton (Fridays)
 The U.S Report with James Morrow (Fridays)
 The Rita Panahi Show with Rita Panahi (Mondays)
 Piers Morgan Uncensored with Piers Morgan (Tuesday-Friday)
 The Front Page with Jenna Clarke (Monday-Friday)
 NewsNight (Monday-Sunday)

Presenters and reporters

News presenters

 Peter Stefanovic
 Jaynie Seal
 Laura Jayes
 Tom Connell
 Ashleigh Gillon
 Kieran Gilbert
 Tim Gilbert
 Danica De Giorgio
 Kristie Lloyd
 Ortenzia Borre

Program presenters

 Rowan Dean
 Rita Panahi
 James Morrow
 Ross Greenwood
 Chris Kenny
 Peta Credlin
 Andrew Bolt
 Cory Bernardi
 Erin Molan
 Paul Murray
 Piers Morgan
 Jack Houghton
 Jenna Clarke

Reporters
 Kenny Heatley, Julia Bradley and Gabriella Power – Sydney
 Holly Edwards-Smith, Georgia Simpson and Simon Love – Melbourne
 Trudy McIntosh, Olivia Caisley and Joel Philp – Canberra
 Lucy Gray and Adam Walters – Brisbane
 Matt Cunningham – Darwin
 Jessica Maggio – Wellington, New Zealand
 Brent O’Halloran - Taipei, Taiwan
 Annelise Nielsen - Washington D.C., U.S.A.

Former presenters and reporters 

 John Gatfield 1996–2008 now with Sky Racing. Co-anchored the first bulletin on 19 February 1996 with Juanita Phillips
 Samantha Armytage
 Dan Bourchier 
 Ross Cameron 
 Brooke Corte 
 Helen Dalley 
 Georgie Gardner 
 Amy Greenbank 
 Stan Grant 
 Leigh Hatcher
 Patricia Karvelas  
 Kristina Keneally  
 Chris Kohler 
 David Koch 
 Mark Latham 
 Prue Lewarne
 Samantha Maiden 
 John Mangos
 Sharon McKenzie
 Melanie McLaughlin 
 Jim Middleton 
 Kelly Nestor
 Janine Perrett
 Juanita Phillips 
 Cameron Price 
 Chris Roe
 Celina Edmonds 
 Vanessa Grimm
 Nina Stevens 
 Amber Sherlock 
 David Speers 
 Greg Thomson 
 Karen Tso 
 Jacinta Tynan
 Peter van Onselen 
 Terry Willesee
 Michael Willesee, Jr.
 Ahron Young
 Craig Norenbergs
 James Bracey

Bureaus

Sky News Australia has a bureau in every capital city in Australia, completing this with the opening of its Hobart studio in 2013. In 2016, it opened a bureau in Cairns, making it the first non-capital city bureau. In 2017, a Gold Coast bureau was opened marking the third non-capital city studio after Cairns and Geelong.

The base of Sky News Australia is in the Sydney suburb of Macquarie Park, from which the majority of its news and programming is broadcast. Its Melbourne studio was upgraded in 2014, allowing it to be used as a secondary broadcast studio. Hinch Live became the first regular program to be broadcast from Melbourne.

The third major bureau is in Parliament House, Canberra, opened in 2000. Lyndal Curtis became Bureau Chief of in October 2015. Additionally, Sky News has a small office in the Channel Seven building in Martin Place, which includes a small street-level single camera studio which looks onto Elizabeth Street, Sydney.

Internationally, Sky News's only foreign bureau is in Wellington, New Zealand, opened in 2015.

Resources 
Apart from its own resources, Sky News Australia uses the news resources of its former parent companies Seven News, Nine News and Sky News UK, as well as sister network Fox News Channel. It signed a four-year partnership deal with CNN International, commencing on 1 January 2011, and additionally has agreements with CCTV China, ABC America, CBS, Reuters, APTN, Bloomberg, Dow Jones and Newshub. Sky News UK, ABC and CBS were founding international partners of Sky News Australia.

Content 
In 2017, Denis Muller, a senior research fellow at the University of Melbourne's Centre for Advancing Journalism, described the channel as having a "split personality," running straight news bulletins and reporting during the day with professional and independent journalists and presenters, while moving towards "right-leaning punditry" in prime time.

In February 2021, Muller, commenting on former Prime Minister Kevin Rudd's statement that Sky News was following a pattern laid down by Fox News, described the nighttime programming of Sky News as including "the unconstrained peddling of extreme right-wing propaganda, lies, disinformation, crude distortion of fact and baseless assertions."

Political alignment and views 

Sky News Australia is considered by commentators to have a conservative, right-wing bias, with frequent criticism of Australia's main progressive political parties, Labor and the Greens. Presenter Paul Murray has stated that "Sky News at night is a Liberal echo chamber". Drawing a strong comparison to Fox News, the network began moving towards panel-based programming from 2010, with most of its highest profile prime time commentators being conservative. Hosts Andrew Bolt and Paul Murray have been compared to Fox News presenters Bill O'Reilly and Sean Hannity respectively.

As many of the channel's primetime contributors are conservatives - many with clear career links to the Liberal Party - the Australian Labor Party and its figureheads Victorian premier Daniel Andrews, Queensland premier Annastacia Palaszczuk and Western Australian premier Mark McGowan are frequently critiqued whilst the policies of the Liberal and National parties of Australia are often endorsed and promoted. During the COVID-19 pandemic beginning in the year 2020, some Sky News commentators referred to Andrews as a 'dictator' and a 'chairman', drawing a comparison to socialist and communist regimes when criticising Andrews' frequent use of pandemic lockdowns and public health orders.

Sky News Australia has been a frequent critic of US President Joe Biden ever since he took office on 20 January 2021. Some reporters such as Andrew Bolt and Alan Jones have frequently commented about Biden's mental health, claiming it was declining and that Biden is unfit to be the President.

Misinformation and conspiracy theories 
On 13 December 2020, Rowan Dean promoted the Great Reset conspiracy theory on Sky News Australia, claiming that "This Great Reset is as serious and dangerous a threat to our prosperity – to your prosperity and your freedom – as we have faced in decades".

As of February 2021, American far-right conspiracy theorist Alex Jones uses segments from Sky News Australia to back up his claims.

In July 2021, Alan Jones and Craig Kelly falsely claimed that United Kingdom data proved that getting vaccinated against COVID-19 would increase the likelihood of death due to COVID-19. The claim originated in The Daily Exposé, a British website known for promoting COVID-19 and anti-vaccine misinformation. The Daily Exposé's claim was debunked by the BBC, Full Fact and Reuters. Sky News Australia subsequently removed the broadcast and issued a correction on its website.

On 1 August 2021, YouTube barred Sky News Australia from uploading new content onto their channel for a week for breaking YouTube's rules on posting videos containing COVID-19 misinformation. Upon the channel's return to the platform, Sky News Australia published a piece titled "Uncancelled: Sky News Australia Set Free" wherein Digital Editor Jack Houghton claimed the channel's temporary banning was the result of Silicon Valley and left-wing media attempting to stifle free speech.

A 2022 analysis by the Institute for Strategic Dialogue, a British think tank, found that Sky News Australia was a major source for climate change misinformation. Sky News Australia rejected the findings of the analysis, saying that they would "continue to encourage debate" on climate change.

Reception

Ratings
Largely, Sky News struggles to garner any significant viewership figures and is largely confined to a core group of around 50,000 nightly primetime viewers across their cable and free-to-air platforms. Thus, the channel rates extremely poorly compared to other news networks such as ABC News and broadcast networks.

The highest rating broadcast on Sky News Australia was an episode of Paul Murray Live on 26 June 2013 (following the 2013 Labor leadership spill), averaging 197,000 viewers across a special two-hour broadcast. The highest audience share Sky News Australia has achieved was during coverage of the 2009 Victorian bushfires.

On 15 December 2014 during the Sydney Lindt café siege, coverage of the unfolding incident took 16 of the 20 most watched programs on the Foxtel platform. The 7 pm (AEST) hour was the highest rated at 109,000 viewers. Sky News achieved a day time share of 2.6% (behind ABC News 24's 3.8%) and a primetime share of 1.5% (behind ABC News 24's 2.5%).

Sky News Live rated 56,000 viewers for early evening coverage of the 2015 Queensland state election, and 83,000 viewers for later coverage, beaten by ABC News 24's coverage which was watched by 195,000 viewers nationally. For its coverage of the failed Liberal leadership spill on 9 February 2015 between 9 am and 10 am, Sky News Live was the second most watched subscription channel and the coverage was the third most watched program of the day with 69,000 viewers.

Sky News Live reached a total audience of 700,000 viewers on 14 September 2015 (including simulcast on Sky News Business) during the 2015 Liberal leadership spill. It was the most watched subscription television channel for the evening and outrated all free-to-air television channels between 11 pm and midnight AEST. The highest rated hour of coverage was from 10pm, achieving 190,000 viewers, the second highest ratings since the 2013 Labor Party spill.

A March 2016 article in The Guardian Australia reported Sky News averages 12,000 national viewers between 6 pm and midnight, with a peak of 18,000 between 8 pm and 10 pm, although the report did not specify what days or dates this average refers to.

During the 2016 federal election, Sky News averaged 96,000 viewers, an increase of 46% from the 2013 election.

In July 2018, Sky News claimed to have achieved its highest ratings on record, with viewership up 9% overall and its weeknight primetime (6pm-11pm) viewership 25% higher on the same period last year, according to OzTAM figures.

In August 2018, coverage of the Liberal Party of Australia leadership spill, 2018 saw Sky News gain its highest Tuesday primetime audience ever with a 4.2% audience share. Speers, Credlin and Jones & Co all had their highest-rated episodes on record.

Criticism
In August 2018, Sky News was heavily criticised for providing a platform to Blair Cottrell, leader of the far-right, Neo-Nazi organisation United Patriots Front in a one-on-one discussion about immigration on The Adam Giles Show. Sky News presenters, including Laura Jayes and David Speers, were among those critical (both on-air and off-air) of his appearance on the program due to the fact that he has expressed admiration for Adolf Hitler and claimed to have manipulated women "using violence and terror." Sky News commentator and former Labor Party minister Craig Emerson resigned in protest after the interview was broadcast, stating that "My father fought Nazis in WWII and was interred in a German POW camp", and that the decision to give Cottrell a platform on Sky News was "another step in a journey to normalising racism & bigotry in our country". The activist group Sleeping Giants Oz called on advertisers to pull advertising campaigns off Sky News in the wake of the channel's interview with Cottrell.

In the aftermath of the Christchurch mosque shootings in March 2019, Sky News Australia was temporarily removed from Sky New Zealand's satellite platform, amid concerns over how the channel's coverage could potentially affect the investigation into the attack; Fox Sports News was added to the platform as a replacement. Sky News Australia was restored to Sky New Zealand on 21 March, six days after the attack.

Accolades

Broadcast 
Sky News began broadcasting in widescreen, along with its sister channels on 17 May 2009. Sky News Australia only provides closed captioning between 4 pm and 5 pm (AEST/AEDT) each day.

Sky News began broadcasting in high definition on 1 December 2015.

Other services

Sky News Multiview 
With the roll-out of Foxtel Digital, Sky News Australia launched the Sky News Active interactive news service based on the Sky News UK service with the same name. The service offered a choice of eight news screens, some with original content not seen on the main channel they vary depending on the days news or events and include the latest news, business, sport, showbiz and weather in text. Other features included interactive polling and the latest news headlines via text. On 15 November 2009 Sky News active re-launched with a new look as well as 5 additional local screens (Sydney, Melbourne, Brisbane, Perth, and Adelaide.

Sky News Now 
Sky News Now was a mobile service available on Vodafone, Telstra and 3. It offered a wide variety of news in both video and text. As of 2015, the service was no longer available.

Sky News Alerts 
Sky News Alerts is a SMS and MMS breaking news service available on all mobile phones inside Australia. Breaking news alerts are sent to a subscriber via SMS or MMS at a cost per message.

Qantas 
In November 2014, Sky News Australia was contracted to provide Qantas with in-flight news bulletins replacing a longstanding contract with the Nine Network.

Podcasting 
Sky News offers various programs via podcast including First Business, Market Day, Showbiz, Agenda, Australian News Week, and Prime News New Zealand.

Sky News Regional 

Sky News Regional (formerly Sky News on WIN) is a free-to-air version of Sky News Australia, which was launched on 2 September 2018. The channel features Sky News Australia and Fox Sports News programming, as well as the original morning newscast Sky News Breakfast. The channel was originally established as part of a partnership with WIN Television. In 2021, WIN's contracts with both Network 10 and Sky News expired; with WIN returning to its previous Nine Network affiliation on 1 July 2021, and Sky News's contract expiring on 1 August 2021 (the allotments were, in turn, used for 9Life). Sky News reached a new agreement with Southern Cross Austereo to distribute the channel, now known as Sky News Regional.

In its first two weeks on the air, the channel averaged 10,000 viewers in primetime and 4,000 viewers in daytime, with Richo the highest rated program at 24,000 viewers.

The channel is available on digital channel 56 across Southern Cross Austereo's regional markets in Regional QLD, Southern NSW & ACT and Regional VIC, and on WIN digital channel 53 in Northern NSW & Gold Coast, Griffith and South East SA. It is not available in Broken Hill, Spencer Gulf, Tasmania, Mildura, Darwin, Remote & Central Australia and Regional WA. Mildura, Tasmania, and Regional Western Australia carried this channel as Sky News on WIN on the WIN network until August 2021 when it switched to 9Life’s feed. The channel was previously on WIN digital channels 83 and 85, prior to the rebrand as Sky News Regional on 1 August 2021.

See also 
 Sky News
 List of programs broadcast by Sky News Australia
 Sky News Business Channel
 Media bias

References

External links

Sky News Regional schedule

 
24-hour television news channels in Australia
Television channels and stations established in 1996
English-language television stations in Australia
Television networks in Australia
Podcasting companies
Conservatism in Australia
Conservative media in Australia